Galavant is an American musical fantasy comedy television series, created and written by Dan Fogelman, with music and lyrics by Alan Menken and Glenn Slater. Fogelman, Menken and Slater also serve as executive producers alongside Chris Koch, Kat Likkel and John Hoberg. Joshua Sasse stars as the titular character, and is joined by principal cast members Timothy Omundson, Vinnie Jones, Mallory Jansen, Karen David, and Luke Youngblood. Jansen described Galavant as "the bastard child of Monty Python and The Princess Bride". 

The series premiered on January 4, 2015, with its first season consisting of eight episodes which aired over four weeks. The series was renewed for a second season of ten episodes on May 7, 2015, which premiered on January 3, 2016, following the same airing scheme as the first season. On May 12, 2016, the series was canceled after two seasons.

Plot
Galavant is a dashing knight, down on his luck, determined to reclaim his reputation and his "happily ever after" by going after the evil King Richard, who ruined it the moment he kidnapped the love of Galavant's life, Madalena, who then decided to stay with Richard for his money and power. Galavant is assisted by his faithful squire, Sid, and the lovely Princess Isabella, whose kingdom of Valencia has been conquered by Richard. Meanwhile, the malevolent but weak-willed Richard tries to win over the scheming Madalena and seeks help from his brawny henchman, Gareth, and his chef, Vincenzo. The episodes chronicle Galavant's journeys (and the twists and turns that go along with them) through musical numbers composed and written by Menken and Slater. They participate in a joust, visit Sid's hometown, are captured by shipwrecked pirates, and make a stop with a band of singing monks before finally being captured by Richard and Gareth as they try to infiltrate the castle to rescue Madalena, who, it turns out, doesn't want or need to be rescued as Isabella had told the group. Richard is knocked off the throne when his older brother, Kingsley, shows up and claims it, and everyone finds themselves locked in the dungeon together. Richard's brother orders the captives executed. Gareth refuses and sets them all free but Sid, but before the new king can retaliate he is stabbed in the back and Madalena puts Gareth on the throne of Valencia beside her. Isabella and crew seek shelter with her cousin Harry in Hortensia, where she is locked away until they can marry, and Richard and Galavant (who, it turns out, is more than a little fickle) set sail with the pirates to rescue her.

In the second season, Richard attempts to find a new role for himself in life, and he falls in love with Roberta Steinglass, a childhood friend. Galavant goes to great lengths to recruit an army to help him on his quest.  Richard also adopts a lizard, believing it will grow into a dragon and draws a sword that he does not know can only be drawn by the "one true king to unite them all." At the same time, Chester Wormwood, an evil sorcerer who doubles as a wedding planner, has taken control of Isabella's mind so she is now accepting being married to her cousin.  When his plan eventually backfires, Isabella exiles him, and he flees to Valencia, where he encourages Gareth and Madalena to start an unplanned war with Hortensia. Wormwood also offers to teach them his "Dark Dark Evil Way" (abbreviated as D'DEW) of sorcery, which Gareth rejects but Madalena secretly accepts. All the episodes lead up to the finale, a huge battle between three armies, including the Valencians, the Hortensians, and a swarm of zombies led by Galavant and Richard.

Cast and characters

Main
 Joshua Sasse as Sir Gary Galavant
 Timothy Omundson as King Richard
 Vinnie Jones as Gareth
 Mallory Jansen as Queen Madalena
 Karen David as Princess Isabella "Izzy" Maria Lucia Elizabetta of Valencia
 Luke Youngblood as Sidney "Sid"

Recurring
 Ben Presley as Steve Mackenzie the Jester. Briefly Madalena's lover, who later becomes Isabella's confidant. He also serves as the series' occasional narrator.
 Darren Evans as Vincenzo, the royal chef of Valencia and Gwynne's love interest.
 Sophie McShera as Gwynne, Madalena's maidservant and Chef Vincenzo's love interest. 
Stanley Townsend as the King of Valencia, Isabella's father.
 Genevieve Allenbury as the Queen of Valencia, Isabella's mother. 
 Hugh Bonneville as Peter the Pillager, the Pirate King
 Al Yankovic as the Head Monk, leader of a group of monks who have taken a vow of singing.
 Rutger Hauer as Kingsley (season 1), Richard's older brother.
 Kemaal Deen-Ellis as Prince Harry of Hortensia, Isabella's eleven-year-old cousin and fiancé.
 Robert Lindsay as Chester Wormwood (season 2), an evil sorcerer and occasional wedding planner who follows the Dark Dark Evil Way (or "D'DEW").
 Clare Foster as Roberta Steinglass (season 2), Richard's childhood friend and eventual love interest.
 Muzz Khan as Barry (season 2), Wormwood's assistant.
 Alfie Simmons as Young Richard
 Sonnyboy Skelton as Young Gareth
 Anthony Head (season 1) and Greg Wise (season 2) as Arnold Galavant, Galavant's estranged father and a former knight who opened a home for troubled youth.
 John Stamos as Sir Jean Hamm, a legendary jouster and Galavant's rival.

Cameos
 Ricky Gervais as Xanax, a magician who offers psychedelic therapy sessions.  
 Kylie Minogue as Queen of The Enchanted Forest, a Medieval gay bar.
 Simon Williams as Uncle Keith, who helps Galavant and Richard escape from The Enchanted Forest.
 Simon Callow as Edwin the Magnificent, a fortune teller who helps Galavant communicate with Isabella.
 Matt Lucas as Peasant John.

Episodes

Season 1 (2015)

Season 2 (2016)

Production

Development
The series reunites screenwriter Dan Fogelman, composer Alan Menken, and lyricist Glenn Slater, who had worked together on the 2010 animated film Tangled (produced by ABC's corporate sibling Walt Disney Animation Studios). The pilot was ordered by ABC in October 2013, and picked up to series in May 2014.

Filming
Principal photography took place in the Bottle Yard Studios in Bristol, United Kingdom.  Peter the Pillager's pirate ship in season one is filmed on the life-size reproduction of The Matthew which lives in Bristol's Floating Harbour.

Other filming locations include Caldicot Castle and Caerphilly Castle in Wales, Southern Down on the Bristol Channel, Berkeley Castle, Cosmeston Medieval Village and Wells Cathedral

Release
The series premiered on January 4, 2015, taking over the timeslot of fellow ABC series Once Upon a Time for the mid-season period. It was billed as a four-week "comedy extravaganza".

On May 7, 2015, the series was renewed for a 10-episode second season. The title of the second season premiere, "A New Season aka Suck It Cancellation Bear", mocks the predicted cancellation by the ratings website TV by the Numbers after the first season.

The series was cancelled on May 12, 2016. Upon cancellation, composer Menken expressed interest in continuing the series on stage.

Music
Galavant is a comedy musical. The incidental music is composed by Menken and Christopher Lennertz. The songs are composed by Menken with lyrics by Slater, and have been described as "self-knowing parodies", both on Menken and Slater's previous work, as well as on classic musicals such as West Side Story. According to Fogelman, the lyrics of the opening song of the second season makes fun of the "eventization" of every limited-run series. They also comment on the shows' broadcast time slot and the missed Emmy nomination.

The following songs featured on Galavant are performed by the Galavant cast.

Season 1 (2015)

An official soundtrack for the first season was released on January 19, 2015.

Season 2 (2016)

An official soundtrack for the second season was released on January 29, 2016.

Home media
Galavant – The Complete Collection was released on DVD as a set consisting of both seasons in Region 1 on November 10, 2017.

Reception

Critical reception
The first season averaged 4.83 million live viewers, and 6.52 million including DVR-playback. It has received generally positive reviews: it currently has a Rotten Tomatoes rating of 90%, based on reviews from 36 critics, with an average rating of 7.5/10. The site's critical consensus reads, "While the jokes in Galavant ride the line of predictability, their execution, along with campy themes and silly musical numbers, make it memorably entertaining." On Metacritic, it has a score of 61 out of 100, based on reviews from 26 critics, indicating "generally favorable reviews".

The New York Times Neil Genzlinger gave it a mixed response saying, "Despite some amusing bits and clever songs, it's only occasionally as much fun as it ought to be." Brian Lowry of Variety gave it a mostly positive review saying, "Owing a strong debt to Monty Python and a lesser one to spoofs like When Things Were Rotten, Galavant largely overcomes the challenges that have traditionally bedeviled TV musicals with rambunctious energy, cheeky lyrics and music, and — significantly — a half-hour format, thus condensing the need to create songs into a manageable task." TV Line's Matt Webb Mitovich wrote, "With some resignation, given a colleague's 'meh' reaction to the pilot, I finally cued up Galavant… and found myself binge-watching the six episodes available to me. (And I seldom binge anything.) That's why I think ABC is smart to double-pump episodes, because yes, the plot progression is a bit slow, pausing as it does to allow for song-and-dance numbers and vamping by the more colorful characters (the king included). You'll want two at a time to come away satisfied." Alan Sepinwall of HitFix, however, was more negative, writing, "...the whole is less than the sum of its comic and musical parts."

The second season was met with equally positive critical response: On Rotten Tomatoes, it has a 100% rating, based on 10 reviews, with an average rating of 7.8/10. The consensus reads: "The surprise second season of Galavant sends its cast in many directions, but keeps the fun and music that made it a hit firmly at its center."  On Metacritic, it has a 77/100 rating based on 4 critics.

Ratings

Season 1 (2015)

Season 2 (2016)

References

External links
 

2010s American musical comedy television series
2010s American romantic comedy television series
2015 American television series debuts
2016 American television series endings
American Broadcasting Company original programming
American fantasy television series
English-language television shows
Television series by ABC Studios
Television series set in the Middle Ages
Wizards in television
Zombies in television
Television shows filmed in the United Kingdom
Television series created by Dan Fogelman
American musical television series